Blackberry is an unincorporated community in Blackberry Township, Itasca County, Minnesota, United States.

The community is located between Grand Rapids and Floodwood at the junction of U.S. Highway 2 (U.S. 2) and Itasca County Road 71 (CR 71).

Nearby places include Grand Rapids, La Prairie, Gunn, Coleraine, Bovey, and Warba.

Blackberry is located seven miles southeast of Grand Rapids.

ZIP codes 55744 (Grand Rapids) and 55709 (Bovey) meet at Blackberry.  The Mississippi River is in the vicinity.

The community of Blackberry is located within Blackberry Township (population 880).

References

 Rand McNally Road Atlas – 2007 edition – Minnesota entry
 Official State of Minnesota Highway Map – 2011/2012 edition
 Mn/DOT map of Itasca County – Sheet 1 – 2011 edition

Unincorporated communities in Minnesota
Unincorporated communities in Itasca County, Minnesota